Hollywood Noir is an original novel based on the U.S. television series Angel.

Plot summary

A decayed corpse at a Hollywood construction site appears to be a harbinger of more supernatural evil. Meanwhile, Doyle has a vision which leads him to a strange address. He, Angel and Cordelia start tracking a cigarette girl, Betty McCoy. Mike Slade, a new P.I. in town, is also tracking this girl. He dresses and acts behind the times, yet his agenda is modern, and he opposes local officials. Angel and his team soon find their research leads them to Slade. They must piece together a story involving the cigarette girl, a water commissioner, and a host of disappearing demons.

Continuity

Supposed to be set early in Angel season 1, before the episode "Hero".
Characters include Angel, Cordelia and Doyle.

Canonical issues

Angel books such as this one are not usually considered by fans as canonical. Some fans consider them stories from the imaginations of authors and artists, while other fans consider them as taking place in an alternative fictional reality. However unlike fan fiction, overviews summarising their story, written early in the writing process, were 'approved' by both Fox and Joss Whedon (or his office), and the books were therefore later published as officially Buffy/Angel merchandise.

External links
Cityofangel.com - Interview with this author about this book.

Reviews
Litefoot1969.bravepages.com - Review of this book by Litefoot
Shadowcat.name - Review of this book

2001 American novels
2001 fantasy novels
Angel (1999 TV series) novels
Novels set in Los Angeles
Novels by Jeff Mariotte